Austroargiolestes elke is a species of Australian damselfly in the family Megapodagrionidae,
commonly known as an azure flatwing. 
It is endemic to the vicinity of Eungella National Park in north-central Queensland, where it inhabits streams in rainforests.

Austroargiolestes elke is a medium-sized to large, black and blue damselfly, with strong pruinescence on adult bodies.
Like other members of the family Megapodagrionidae, it rests with its wings outspread.

Gallery

See also
 List of Odonata species of Australia

References

External links 
 

Megapodagrionidae
Odonata of Australia
Insects of Australia
Endemic fauna of Australia
Taxa named by Günther Theischinger
Taxa named by A.F. (Tony) O'Farrell
Insects described in 1986
Damselflies